Josefa Saisó Sempere (Valencia, 1929 – Mexico City, 1997) was an architect and academic who belonged to Spanish republican exile in Mexico.

Biography 
She was born in Valencia in 1929. She left the port of Portbou and arrived in Veracruz in 1937.

Career 
She studied at the National School of Architecture of the National Autonomous University of Mexico, where she graduated in 1962. Later he taught "Theory of Architecture" at the same university. She was part of the "Autogobierno UNAM" programme and coordinator of Taller Uno. She was a professor in the Technology area and coordinator of professional exams. The auditorium of the Faculty of Architecture bears her name, "Pepita Saisó".

She worked in an office with Cuauhtémoc Vega, with whom she won in 1985 the National Competition for Housing in Wood.

References 

1929 births
1997 deaths
Mexican architects
Women architects